There are currently 12 two-star officers in the Armed Forces of the Islamic Republic of Iran: four with the regular army (Artesh) background, seven who served in the Islamic Revolutionary Guard Corps and one with both backgrounds.

Although the ranks of general (Arteshbod) and lieutenant general (sepahbod) exist in Iran by the book, the highest military rank practically available to active duty personnel of the Iranian Armed Forces during Islamic Republic era had been two-star rank of major general (sarlashgar) and its naval equivalent rear admiral (daryaban).

While Islamic Revolutionary Guard Corps did not use military ranks until 1991, the Islamic Republic of Iran Army was mainly headed by mere colonels until the first post-revolutionary promotion ceremony of its personnel to general ranks in May 1987, in which Qasem-Ali Zahirnejad was the only one promoted to two-star rank. No two-star general has ever served in the Law Enforcement Force of the Islamic Republic of Iran.

Current two-star generals

Deceased two-star generals

References 

 
Lists of Iranian military personnel
Two-star officers